Tredegar is the self-titled debut album by the Welsh heavy metal band Tredegar. The vocals on all but one song on the album were recorded by guest singer Carl Sentence as the band did not have a full-time frontman in place when recording began. Russ North joined as the permanent vocalist during the recording sessions and sung on "Which Way to Go."

As part of their live set they played covers of a number of Budgie songs including "Breadfan", "Napoleon Bonapart", "Zoom Club" and "Parents".

Track listing
All songs written by Ray Philips and Tony Bourge.
Side One
"Duma" – 3:09
"The Alchemist" – 6:56
"Way of the Warrior" – 3:20
"Richard III" – 4:49

Side two
"Battle of Bosworth" – 3:29
"The Jester" – 3:37
"Which Way to Go" – 5:43
"Wheels" – 4:23

Personnel
Tredegar
Russ North – lead vocals on "Which Way to Go" 
Tony Bourge – lead guitar
Andy Wood – guitar, producer
Tom Prince – bass guitar
Ray Phillips – drums, producer

Additional musicians
Carl Sentence – lead vocals

Production
John Wase - producer, engineer

References

1986 debut albums
Tredegar (band) albums